Gymnogobius is a genus of gobies found in marine, brackish and fresh waters of Asia and the western Pacific Ocean.

Species
There are currently 16 recognized species in this genus:
 Gymnogobius breunigii (Steindachner, 1879)
 Gymnogobius castaneus (O'Shaughnessy, 1875) (Biringo)
 Gymnogobius cylindricus (Tomiyama, 1936)
 Gymnogobius heptacanthus (Hilgendorf, 1879)
 Gymnogobius isaza (S. Tanaka (I), 1916)
 Gymnogobius macrognathos (Bleeker, 1860)
 Gymnogobius mororanus (D. S. Jordan & Snyder, 1901)
 Gymnogobius nigrimembranis (H. W. Wu & Ki. Fu. Wang, 1931)
 Gymnogobius opperiens D. E. Stevenson, 2002
 Gymnogobius petschiliensis (Rendahl, 1924)
 Gymnogobius scrobiculatus (Takagi, 1957)
 Gymnogobius taranetzi (Pinchuk, 1978)
 Gymnogobius transversefasciatus (H. L. Wu & Z. M. Zhou, 1990)
 Gymnogobius uchidai (Takagi, 1957)
 Gymnogobius urotaenia (Hilgendorf, 1879)
 Gymnogobius zhoushanensis S. L. Zhao, H. L. Wu & J. S. Zhong, 2007

References

Gobionellinae
Taxa named by Theodore Gill